Sudan and South Sudan have multiple regional sign languages, which are not mutually intelligible. A survey of just three states found 150 sign languages, though this number included instances of home sign. Government figures estimate there are at least about 48,900 deaf people in Sudan. By 2009, the Sudanese National Union of the Deaf had worked out a Unified Sudanese Sign Language, but it had not yet been widely disseminated.

References

Sign language isolates
Languages of Sudan
Languages of South Sudan